General Lynch may refer to:

Jarvis Lynch (born 1933), U.S. Marine Corps major general
Liam Lynch (Irish republican) (1892–1923), Irish Republican Army general

See also
Attorney General Lynch (disambiguation)